Robert Irwin Chartoff (August 26, 1933 – June 10, 2015) was an American film producer and philanthropist.

Early life and education
Chartoff was born on August 26, 1933 in New York City, the son of Bessie and William Chartoff. His family was Jewish. He graduated from Union College in 1955, followed by Columbia University Law School.

Career
Chartoff produced more than 30 movies, including the Rocky film series boxing series. He and fellow producer Irwin Winkler won an Academy Award for Best Picture for its 1976 debut film, Rocky.

Philanthropy
Chartoff established the RC Charitable Foundation in 1990 to award grants to international schools and other child agencies. He served as its President. The RC Charitable Foundation gives grants awards to the Buddha Educational Trust. He served on the Community Advisory Board of the Younes and Soraya Israel Studies Center at UCLA.

Personal life
Chartoff's first wife was Phyllis Raphael, with whom he had three children – Jenifer, William and Julie – before divorcing. In 1970, he married British actress Vanessa Howard, with whom he had one son, Charley. That marriage also ended in divorce. He last married Jenny Weyman, with whom he had one daughter, Miranda. He died at his home in Santa Monica, California in 2015 from pancreatic cancer, leaving a widow.

Filmography
He was a producer in all films unless otherwise noted.

Film

Thanks

References

External links 

1933 births
2015 deaths
Businesspeople from New York City
Union College (New York) alumni
Film producers from New York (state)
Jewish American philanthropists
Producers who won the Best Picture Academy Award
Philanthropists from New York (state)
Golden Globe Award-winning producers
Columbia Law School alumni
Deaths from pancreatic cancer
Deaths from cancer in California
20th-century American businesspeople
20th-century American philanthropists
21st-century American Jews